Salah Jassim Beden (born 3 July 1956) is an Iraqi boxer. He competed in the men's light middleweight event at the 1980 Summer Olympics.

References

1956 births
Living people
Iraqi male boxers
Olympic boxers of Iraq
Boxers at the 1980 Summer Olympics
Place of birth missing (living people)
Light-middleweight boxers